California Township may refer to the following places in the United States:

 California Township, Madison County, Arkansas
 California Township, Starke County, Indiana
 California Township, Michigan

Township name disambiguation pages